
 
UNODC Goodwill Ambassador is an official postnominal honorific title, title of authority, legal status and job description assigned to those who are designated by the United Nations. UNODC goodwill ambassadors are celebrity advocates of the United Nations Office on Drugs and Crime and use their talent, popularity or fame to assist the UN in better addressing a coordinated, comprehensive response to the interrelated issues of illicit trafficking in and abuse of drugs, crime prevention and criminal justice, international terrorism, and political corruption. 

The UNODC goodwill ambassador program has enlisted the help of prominent personalities from the worlds of art, music, film, sport and literature to highlight key issues and to draw attention to its activities in the fight against illicit drugs and international crime.

Current UNODC goodwill ambassadors 
Current listed and supporting goodwill ambassadors, and the year they were appointed:

See also 
 Goodwill Ambassador
 FAO Goodwill Ambassador
 UNDP Goodwill Ambassador
 UNHCR Goodwill Ambassador
 UNESCO Goodwill Ambassador
 UNFPA Goodwill Ambassador
 UN Women Goodwill Ambassador
 UNIDO Goodwill Ambassador
 UNICEF Goodwill Ambassador
 WFP Goodwill Ambassador
 WHO Goodwill Ambassador

References

External links 

 UNODC Goodwill Ambassadors

Goodwill ambassador programmes
United Nations goodwill ambassadors